Scanning helium microscope may refer to:
 Scanning helium microscopy
 Scanning Helium Ion Microscope
Atomic nanoscope, which was proposed and discussed in the literature, but is not yet competitive with optical microscope, electron microscope, Scanning Helium Ion Microscope and various scanning probe microscopes